Coelostoma is a genus of beetles belonging to the family Hydrophilidae. The genus was first described by Brullé in 1835. The genus has cosmopolitan distribution, with 111 described species, representing one of the most diverse genera of Hydrophilidae.

Description
Body rather convex, brown to black. Eyes are medium in size, and deeply excised internally. Antenna consists with 9 antennomeres, and loosely segmented antennal club. Mesoventrite consists with a arrow-head shaped median elevation. Metaventrite is longer than mesoventral elevation. There are strongly raised median portion in Metaventrite broadly projecting anteriorly which become abutted to mesoventral process. Elytra lacking serial punctures.

Species
 Coelostoma aeneolum Régimbart, 1903
 Coelostoma aethiopicum Orchymont, 1936
 Coelostoma afflatum Knisch, 1922
 Coelostoma alluaudi Mouchamps, 1958
 Coelostoma anthracinum J.Balfour-Browne, 1939
 Coelostoma assinicum Mouchamps, 1958
 Coelostoma austrine Mouchamps, 1958
 Coelostoma balfourbrownei M.Hansen, 1999
 Coelostoma basilewskyi Mouchamps, 1958
 Coelostoma bechynei J.Balfour-Browne, 1959
 Coelostoma bhutanicum Jayaswal, 1972
 Coelostoma bibilense Hebauer, 2000
 Coelostoma bifidum Jia, Fenglong, Aston & Fikáček, 2014
 Coelostoma bipunctatum Jayaswal, 1972
 Coelostoma brachaurum Mouchamps, 1958
 Coelostoma brownei Mouchamps, 1958
 Coelostoma brunneum Mouchamps, 1958
 Coelostoma bullosum Mouchamps, 1958
 Coelostoma camerunense Mouchamps, 1958
 Coelostoma centrale Mouchamps, 1958
 Coelostoma collarti Mouchamps, 1958
 Coelostoma conradsi Orchymont, 1936
 Coelostoma coomani Orchymont, 1932
 Coelostoma cooptatum Orchymont, 1932
 Coelostoma coortum Orchymont, 1932
 Coelostoma dentatum Knisch, 1924
 Coelostoma deplexum J.Balfour-Browne, 1950
 Coelostoma diversum Orchymont, 1932
 Coelostoma dolum J.Balfour-Browne, 1950
 Coelostoma ealanum Orchymont, 1941
 Coelostoma edwardsi J.Balfour-Browne, 1940
 Coelostoma erinna J.Balfour-Browne, 1950
 Coelostoma escalerai Hernando, 1997
 Coelostoma fabricii (Montrouzier, 1860)
 Coelostoma fallaciosum Orchymont, 1936
 Coelostoma fallacosum Orchymont, 1936
 Coelostoma freudei Mouchamps, 1958
 Coelostoma freyi Mouchamps, 1958
 Coelostoma gentilii Jia, Fenglong, Aston & Fikáček, 2014
 Coelostoma hajeki Jia, Fenglong, Aston & Fikáček, 2014
 Coelostoma himalayanum Hebauer, 2002
 Coelostoma hirsutum Mouchamps, 1958
 Coelostoma hispanicum (Küster, 1848)
 Coelostoma homalinum Hebauer, 2002
 Coelostoma hongkongense Jia, Fenglong, Aston & Fikáček, 2014
 Coelostoma horni (Régimbart, 1902)
 Coelostoma huangi Jia, Fenglong, Aston & Fikáček, 2014
 Coelostoma injuratum J.Balfour-Browne, 1952
 Coelostoma insidiosum Mouchamps, 1958
 Coelostoma insolitum Orchymont, 1936
 Coelostoma irregulare Hebauer, 2001
 Coelostoma jaechi Jia, Fenglong, Renchao Lin, Eric Chan, Skale & Fikáček, 2017
 Coelostoma jeanneli Mouchamps, 1958
 Coelostoma kantnerorum Hebauer, 2006
 Coelostoma lamottei J.Balfour-Browne, 1958
 Coelostoma lazarense Orchymont, 1925
 Coelostoma lemuriense Mouchamps, 1958
 Coelostoma leonense J.Balfour-Browne, 1939
 Coelostoma lesnei Orchymont, 1936
 Coelostoma lyratum Sheth, Ghate & Fikáček, 2020
 Coelostoma marshalli J.Balfour-Browne, 1950
 Coelostoma martensi Hebauer, 2002
 Coelostoma medianum Hebauer, 2002
 Coelostoma mocquerysi Orchymont, 1936
 Coelostoma montanum Mouchamps, 1958
 Coelostoma mouchampsi M.Hansen, 1999
 Coelostoma neavei J.Balfour-Browne, 1950
 Coelostoma nostocinum Sheth, Ghate & Fikáček, 2020
 Coelostoma oceanicum Mouchamps, 1958
 Coelostoma optatum J.Balfour-Browne, 1952
 Coelostoma orbiculare (Fabricius, 1775)
 Coelostoma orchymonti Mouchamps, 1958
 Coelostoma orientale Mouchamps, 1958
 Coelostoma parkeri Mouchamps, 1958
 Coelostoma phalacroides Régimbart, 1903
 Coelostoma phallicum Orchymont, 1940
 Coelostoma picturatum Orchymont, 1936
 Coelostoma protervum J.Balfour-Browne, 1959
 Coelostoma proximum Mouchamps, 1958
 Coelostoma punctulatum (Klug, 1833)
 Coelostoma remotum Mouchamps, 1958
 Coelostoma rhodesiense J.Balfour-Browne, 1950
 Coelostoma rhomphea Orchymont, 1936
 Coelostoma rohani Orchymont, 1931
 Coelostoma rubens Hebauer, 2002
 Coelostoma rubiginosum J.Balfour-Browne, 1950
 Coelostoma rufitarse (Boheman, 1851)
 Coelostoma rusticum Orchymont, 1936
 Coelostoma rutarum Orchymont, 1936
 Coelostoma salvazai Orchymont, 1919
 Coelostoma segne J.Balfour-Browne, 1952
 Coelostoma simulans Orchymont, 1925
 Coelostoma solitarium Mouchamps, 1958
 Coelostoma stultum (Walker, 1858)
 Coelostoma subditum Orchymont, 1936
 Coelostoma subsphaeroides (Régimbart, 1907)
 Coelostoma subtile Orchymont, 1936
 Coelostoma surkhetensis Hebauer, 2002
 Coelostoma syriacum Orchymont, 1936
 Coelostoma tangliangi Jia, Fenglong, Renchao Lin, Eric Chan, Skale & Fikáček, 2017
 Coelostoma thienemanni Orchymont, 1932
 Coelostoma tina Spangler & Steiner, 2003
 Coelostoma togoense Hebauer, 2003
 Coelostoma tortuosum J.Balfour-Browne, 1959
 Coelostoma transcaspicum Reitter, 1906
 Coelostoma trilobum G.Müller, 1942
 Coelostoma turnai Hebauer, 2006
 Coelostoma vagum Orchymont, 1940
 Coelostoma vitalisi Orchymont, 1923
 Coelostoma vividum Orchymont, 1936
 Coelostoma waterstradti Orchymont, 1936
 Coelostoma wittei J.Balfour-Browne, 1950
 Coelostoma wui Orchymont, 1940
 Coelostoma zumpti Orchymont, 1937

References

Hydrophilidae